The Sanya ePrix was an automobile race of the Formula E championship in Sanya, People's Republic of China. Its first and only appearance on the Formula E calendar was in the 2018–19 season.

History

China had hosted two ePrix before on the Beijing Olympic Green Circuit, located in the grounds of the Olympic Stadium used initially for the 2008 Summer Olympics. The two races took place in 2014 and 2015. In July 2018 it was announced that Formula E would return to mainland China for the 2018–19 season, now in Sanya. 

The first race took place on 23 March 2019, as Race 6 of the calendar. The inaugural event was won by Jean-Éric Vergne driving for DS Techeetah. The race was not without incidents, with an early crash causing Stoffel Vandoorne and Sam Bird to retire, before finishing the race under a yellow flag due an incident involving Robin Frijns, Lucas Di Grassi and Sebastien Buemi.

The Sanya ePrix was on the Formula E schedule for March 2020, but was cancelled due to the Covid-19 pandemic. The race was due to return in March 2021, but it did not materialise and again for March 2023, however it is now likely to be postponed until 2024.

Circuit
It is a  temporary street circuit with 11 corners. The circuit runs anticlockwise. The circuit featured a number of tight 90° and 180° turns, whilst also enjoying two long straights that passed over two bridges. The pitlane exited between turns 2 and 3, and the "Attack Mode" boost was located on the outside of Turn 3's exit. The pit and paddock is a temporary construction in a car park.

Before the circuit hosted the 2019 Sanya ePrix, it was treated with a resin to ensure it did not break up.

Results

References 

 
Formula E ePrix
Motorsport competitions in China
Sport in Sanya
Recurring sporting events established in 2019